Irvin-Patchin House is a historic home located in Burnside, Pennsylvania, United States.  It is a -story brick dwelling, with 3-story brick addition, constructed initially in 1850. It was constructed by William Irvin, an early settler in western Clearfield County.

It was listed on the National Register of Historic Places in 1979.

References

See also 
 National Register of Historic Places listings in Clearfield County, Pennsylvania

Houses on the National Register of Historic Places in Pennsylvania
Federal architecture in Pennsylvania
Houses completed in 1850
Houses in Clearfield County, Pennsylvania
National Register of Historic Places in Clearfield County, Pennsylvania